Barre Mills is a small unincorporated community in the town of Barre in La Crosse County, Wisconsin, United States. It is part of the La Crosse Metropolitan Statistical Area.

History
Samuels' Cave, an important rock shelter among ancient people, is located in Barre Mills. It is on the National Register of Historic Places.

Barre Mills was also home to a Freethinkers Society. The society hall is now the Barre town hall.

References 

Unincorporated communities in Wisconsin
Unincorporated communities in La Crosse County, Wisconsin